Palinurina is an extinct genus of crustaceans, belonging to the decapods. These animals lived between the Lower Jurassic and the Upper Jurassic (about 195 - 150 million years ago) and their fossils can be found in Europe (England and Germany). This crustacean is considered one of the oldest lobsters.

Species
Species within this genus include: 
Palinurina longipes  Munster 1839
Palinurina tenera Oppel 1862

Description

These species was rather small compared to the current lobsters, and the side generally did not exceed 5 centimeters in length (without antennae).

The appearance was however very similar to today's forms, with a more or less rectangular carapace, an exoskeleton covered with small tubercles, very elongated antennae and five pairs of elongated and strong legs.

Both the species have been found in the Solnhofen field in Bavaria. They can be distinguished by some antenna characteristics: Palinurina tenera had antennas segmented with smooth margin, while in Palinutina longipes margin  was notched.

Palinurina is very similar to another archaic lobster, Archaeopalinurus, originating from the Italian upper Triassic.

Between the two genera, however, there were some morphological differences, mainly with regard to the shape and ornamentation of the caudal fan, to the length of the legs and antennae.

Bibliography
Georg zu Münster (1839). Decapoda Macroura. Abbildung und Beschreibung der fossilen langschwänzigen Krebse in den Kalkschiefern von Baiern. Beiträge zur Petrefacten-Kunde. 2. Bayreuth, Germany. pp. 43–45.
Forste r R., 1973 - Untersuchungen an oberjurassischen Palinuridae (Crustacea, Decapoda). Mitt. Bayer. Staatssamml. Palaont. hist. Geol., 13: 31–46, Monaco di Baviera.
Alessandro Garassino & Günter Schweigert (2006). "The Upper Jurassic Solnhofen decapod crustacean fauna: review of the types from old descriptions. Part I. Infraorders Astacidea, Thalassinidea, and Palinura". Memorie della Società Italiana di Scienze Naturali e del Museo Civico di Storia Naturale di Milano 34.

References

External links
 Museum National d’Histoire Naturelle 
 Die Fossilien von Solnhofen 

Achelata
Fossil taxa described in 1839